Jacqueline Marie Arroyo is an American judge. She is Judge of the Superior Court of Santa Clara County, California.  She replaced retired judge Charles Cory on the Santa Clara Superior Court in May 2008 after being appointed by then Governor Arnold Schwarzenegger.  She is married to Molly O'Neal, Public Defender of Santa Clara County, and that they have two children.

See also
List of Asian American jurists

References

American women judges
Living people
Superior court judges in the United States
Year of birth missing (living people)
American jurists of Asian descent
21st-century American women